

The Europa Bridge or Bridge of Europe (Europabrücke) is a  bridge carrying the A13 Brenner Autobahn (and European route E45) over the  Wipp valley just south of Innsbruck, Tyrol, Austria. The bridge spans the Sill River, and forms part of the main route across the Alps from western Austria to South Tyrol in Italy. It is also part of the main route between southeastern Germany and northern Italy.

It hosts a 192-meter Bungee Jump, the fifth highest in the world.

Record
The Italia Viaduct took over this title in 1974.

See also
 List of highest bridges in the world
 List of tallest bridges in the world
 List of bridges in Austria

References

External links

 

Bridges in Austria
Bridges completed in 1963
1963 establishments in Austria
20th-century architecture in Austria